Ashford Road was a cricket ground in Eastbourne, Sussex.  The first recorded match on the ground was in 1857, when Eastbourne played a United All-England Eleven.  Sussex played  Kent in the grounds first first-class match.  The second and final first-class match held at the ground was played in 1873 and was between Sussex and Kent.  The final recorded match held on the ground came in 1879 when the Eastbourne played E Christian's XI.  The site is today occupied by buildings.

References

External links
Ashford Road on CricketArchive
Ashford Road on Cricinfo

Defunct cricket grounds in England
Sport in Eastbourne
Cricket grounds in East Sussex
Defunct sports venues in East Sussex
Sports venues completed in 1857
1857 establishments in England